Swimming at the 2022 World Aquatics Championships took place from 18 to 25 June 2022. The United States won the most gold medals (17) and overall medal count (45) in this discipline. Katie Ledecky of the United States and Léon Marchand of France earned FINA Swimmer of the Meet honors based on a scoring system that awards points for top-four finishes.

Schedule
42 events were held.

All times were local (UTC+2).

Medal summary

Medal table

Men

 Swimmers who participated in the heats only and received medals.

Women

 Swimmers who participated in the heats only and received medals.

Mixed

 Swimmers who participated in the heats only and received medals.

Records
The following world and championship records were broken during the competition.

World records

Area records

Championship records

References

External links
Official website

 
Swimming
World Aquatics Championships
Swimming at the World Aquatics Championships
Swimming competitions in Hungary